Kamiane is an urban-type settlement in the Zaporizhzhia Raion of Zaporizhzhia Oblast in southern Ukraine, but was formerly administered within Vilniansk Raion. Population: . Kamiane is the administrative center of the Kamiane Council, a local government area.

The settlement was first founded in 1886 as a settlement Voznesenivka or Vozdvyzhenka. After the World War II it was renamed as Kamiane. On 11 February 1986 it became an urban-type settlement.

References

External links
 

Populated places established in 1886
1886 establishments in the Russian Empire

Urban-type settlements in Zaporizhzhia Raion